James Lomas (born 21 April 1975) is an English actor, known for his soap opera roles as Warren Fox in Hollyoaks and Jake Stone in EastEnders.

Early life
Jamie Lomas was born on 21 April 1975 in Manchester.

Career
Before joining Hollyoaks in 2006, Lomas had minor roles in Heartbeat playing Craig Harker in 2005 and in Casualty playing Nathan Simmonds in 2005. Lomas left Hollyoaks in 2011. 

Lomas made a full-time return to Hollyoaks in May 2016, before he departed again in November 2017. He made a one-off appearance in May 2018 and again in July 2019, before making a full-time return in January 2020. Lomas was also on the seventeenth series of I'm a Celebrity...Get Me Out of Here! and finished in second place.

Personal life
Lomas has a son named Billy (born 2006) with his former girlfriend. 

He and singer and actress Kym Marsh announced their relationship in July 2008. In December 2008, Lomas and Marsh announced they were expecting a baby together, due in the summer of 2009. On 12 February 2009, Marsh released a statement on behalf of the couple, announcing their son, Archie Jay Lomas, had been born 18 weeks early on 11 February, and had died moments after birth. 

In 2020, he announced that despite being asymptomatic, he had tested positive for coronavirus during the COVID-19 pandemic, which led to him being forced to cancel his appearance in The Real Full Monty on Ice.

Awards and nominations
Lomas was nominated for Villain of the Year and Best Actor at the British Soap Awards in 2007, 2008 and 2009. As well as this, he was also nominated for Sexiest Male in 2007 and 2008. Lomas, alongside Gemma Bissix, Hannah Tointon and Chris Fountain, won the award for Most Spectacular Scene in 2008 for Clare Devine driving off a cliff. He was also nominated for Best Actor for his role as Warren Fox since returning at the 2017 British Soap Awards.

Filmography

Film

Television

References

External links
 Official website
 

1975 births
English male film actors
English male soap opera actors
I'm a Celebrity...Get Me Out of Here! (British TV series) participants
Living people
People from Bury, Greater Manchester
Actors from Manchester
Actors from Lancashire